The Great North is an American animated sitcom created by Wendy Molyneux, Lizzie Molyneux, and Minty Lewis that premiered on Fox on January 3, 2021.

 In August 2022, Fox renewed the series for a fourth season.

Series overview

Episodes

Season 1 (2021)

Season 2 (2021–22)

Season 3 (2022–23)

Ratings

Season 1

Season 2

Season 3

Notes

References

Lists of American adult animated television series episodes
Lists of American sitcom episodes